The 1973–74 season was Stoke City's 67th season in the Football League and the 43rd in the First Division.

The season started well for Stoke as they won the short lived Watney Cup prior to the start of the new campaign. But their league form was poor and by January they were in the bottom six. But the signing of Alan Hudson from Chelsea sparked an upturn in results which accumulated in beating Leeds United 3–2 in February ending their 29 match un-beaten run. Stoke continued to climb the table and after remaining unbeaten in their final nine fixtures they took 5th position in the table and qualified for the UEFA Cup.

Season review

League
Stoke, with no major summer signings, kicked off the 1973–74 season with George Eastham as assistant manager and the team got off to a fine start, winning the Watney Cup by beating Hull City 2–0 in the final. The opening league form though, was poor although there was a glimmer of hope as Nantwich born Dave Goodwin made a goal-scoring debut against West Ham United. By January 1974 Stoke were struggling in 17th position and the home support was slowly falling and Tony Waddington decided to sell the promising Stewart Jump to Malcolm Allison's Crystal Palace for £75,000 which raised a few questions from the supporters.

But there was method to the manager's apparent madness as he pulled off another major transfer swoop when he paid £240,000 for Chelsea's Alan Hudson. Hudson was an instant hit with the Stoke fans and in his debut against Liverpool he was named as man of the match, helping Stoke to a 1–1 draw. Stoke's next home match against Hudson's old team Chelsea was the first League match to be played on a Sunday, Stoke winning 1–0 in front of 31,985. Another big attendance, saw City's next home match against high-flying Leeds United who had gone 29 matches without defeat. At the time Don Revie's side were nine points clear at the top and they looked to be increasing their lead as they raced into a 2–0 lead, but Stoke rising to the challenge levelled before half time before Denis Smith grabbed the winner and Leeds' magnificent run was over, but they still took the First Division title. Stoke lost just twice in the final 23 matches and raised up the table to claim 5th place and so qualifying for next season's UEFA Cup.

FA Cup
Despite scoring twice at Bolton Wanderers Stoke lost 3–2 in the third round.

League Cup
After narrow wins over Chelsea and Middlesbrough, Coventry City knocked Stoke out with a narrow victory of their own.

Final league table

Results

Stoke's score comes first

Legend

Football League First Division

FA Cup

League Cup

Texaco Cup

Watney Cup

Friendlies

Squad statistics

References

Stoke City F.C. seasons
Stoke